Jiang Jing (born 23 October 1985 in Jiangsu) is a Chinese race walker.

Achievements

References

1985 births
Living people
Athletes (track and field) at the 2004 Summer Olympics
Chinese female racewalkers
Olympic athletes of China
Athletes from Jiangsu